The first season of The Voice, the Indian reality talent show, premiered on 6 June 2015 and concluded on 30 August 2015, with Pawandeep Rajan being crowned as the winner.

Coaches and hosts
In April 2015, &TV and show producer Endemol India announced leading Bollywood singers Himesh Reshammiya, Mika Singh, Shaan and Sunidhi Chauhan as the coaches for the first season and Karan Tacker as the host. Endemol India announced that Terence Lewis would be choreographing the opening act for the premiere of the show.

Sunidhi Chauhan during the premiere of the show on 6 June 2015, flaunted a dress worth . The dress was especially created for her by internationally acclaimed Indian fashion designers Falguni and Shane Peacock. Chauhan wore the dress for a two minute-performance. Chauhan in a statement said, "Everything about the evening was just so grand - right from the spectacular production, the choreography, and my look."

Season overview
Key

Each coach was allowed to advance seven top to the live shows:

Teams
Color key

The Blind Auditions

Week 1

Episode 1: 6 June 2015

Episode 2: 7 June 2015

Week 2

Episode 3: 13 June 2015

Episode 4: 14 June 2015

Week 3

Episode 5: 20 June 2015

Episode 6: 21 June 2015

Week 4

Episode 7: 27 June 2015

Episode 8: 28 June 2015

Week 5

Episode 9: 4 July 2015

Episode 10: 5 July 2015

The Battle Rounds

Week 6

Episode 11: 11 July 2015
Key
 Battle Winner
 Eliminated Artist

Episode 12: 12 July 2015

Week 7

Episode 13: 18 July 2015

Episode 14: 19 July 2015

Week 8

Episode 15: 25 July 2015

Episode 16: 26 July 2015

The Live Shows

Week 9

Episode 17: 1 August 2015
 – Contestant saved by the public vote
 – Contestant saved by coach
 – Contestant eliminated

Episode 18: 2 August 2015

Week 10

Episode 19: 8 August 2015

Episode 20: 9 August 2015

Week 11

Episode 21: 15 August 2015

Episode 22: 16 August 2015

Week 12

Episode 23: 22 August 2015

Episode 24: 23 August 2015

Live Semi-Final and Finale

Week 13

Episode 25: 29 August 2015
The coaches were not allowed to save anyone anymore now-onwards.

Episode 26: 30 August 2015

The last episode was started an hour before and aired for 2 hours.

Key
 Winner
 Runner-up
 Third place
 Fourth place

Competition performances

References

External links
 

The Voice (Indian TV series)
2015 Indian television seasons